Bradford Village Historic District may refer to:

 Bradford Village Historic District (Hopkinton and Westerly, Rhode Island)
 Bradford Village Historic District (Bradford, Vermont)